There are several places called Mount Dixon:

Mount Dixon (Alaska), in the United States
Mount Dixon (Heard Island), in Australia's subantarctic islands
Dixon Peak, previously known as Mount Dixon, in Aoraki/Mount Cook National Park, New Zealand
Mount Dixon (North Canterbury), in the northern Canterbury Region of New Zealand
Mount Dixon (Northern Territory), in Australia